The 2011 Insight Bowl, the 23rd edition of the game, was a post-season American college football bowl game, held on December 30, 2011 at Sun Devil Stadium in Tempe, Arizona as part of the 2011–12 NCAA Bowl season.

The game was telecast at 8:00 p.m. MT on ESPN. The Iowa Hawkeyes of the Big Ten Conference faced the Oklahoma Sooners of the Big 12 Conference. Oklahoma won by a score of 31–14.

The game was briefly suspended with 2:22 remaining in the fourth quarter when one of ESPN's skycams crashed onto the field, nearly hitting Iowa wide receiver Marvin McNutt, Jr. The incident has since gone viral on YouTube.

For the 2012 season, the bowl had a new sponsor and a new name as it became the Buffalo Wild Wings Bowl.

Teams
After winning the 2010 Insight Bowl 27–24 over Missouri, the Iowa Hawkeyes are back to take on the Sooners of Oklahoma, which began the season as the top-ranked team in both the Associated Press and ESPN coaches’ polls. The two teams have met only once, in 1979 when Oklahoma defeated Iowa 21–6 in head coach Hayden Fry's second game. On that team were Bob Stoops, the current Oklahoma head coach, and Bruce Kittle, currently a Sooner assistant coach.

Iowa

The Hawkeyes opened the season unranked, and could not put together anything longer than a two-game winning streak during the 2011 season. The bright spot was a win over No. 13 Michigan at Kinnick Stadium. Iowa entered the Insight Bowl at 7–5 overall (4–4 B1G).

Oklahoma

After opening the season as the No. 1 ranked team in the preseason polls, the Sooners entered the Insight Bowl with a 9–3 record (6–3 Big 12). Coming off a 44–10 loss to No. 3 Oklahoma State, the Sooners were looking to build momentum for the 2012 season. Head coach Bob Stoops and assistant Bruce Kittle played at Iowa under Hayden Fry in the 1980s.

Game summary

Statistics

References

2011–12 NCAA football bowl games
2011
2011
2011
Sports in Tempe, Arizona
2011 in sports in Arizona
December 2011 sports events in the United States
2011 Insight Bowl